Vado is an unincorporated community and census-designated place (CDP) in Doña Ana County, New Mexico, United States. The population was 3,194 at the 2010 census. The ZIP code for Vado is 88072, its area code is 575, and it is part of the Las Cruces Metropolitan Statistical Area.

History 
Founded in 1920 by Francis “Frank” Marion Boyer and his wife Ella Louise, after the previous freedom colony they founded, Blackdom, New Mexico, became a ghost town due to water well issues.

Geography
Vado is located in southeastern Doña Ana County at  (32.129233, -106.651006). It is in the Mesilla Valley, on the east side of the Rio Grande. Interstate 10 forms the eastern edge of the CDP, with access from Exit 155. I-10 leads north  to Las Cruces, the county seat, and south  to El Paso, Texas.

Demographics

As of the census of 2000, there were 3,003 people, 776 households, and 709 families residing in the CDP. The population density was 1,013.8 people per square mile (391.7/km). There were 814 housing units at an average density of 274.8 per square mile (106.2/km). The racial makeup of the CDP was 53.98% White, 1.03% African American, 1.50% Native American, 0.07% Asian, 39.93% from other races, and 3.50% from two or more races. Hispanic or Latino of any race were 95.00% of the population.

There were 776 households, out of which 61.0% had children under the age of 18 living with them, 68.6% were married couples living together, 16.9% had a female householder with no husband present, and 8.6% were non-families. 7.0% of all households were made up of individuals, and 3.0% had someone living alone who was 65 years of age or older. The average household size was 3.87 and the average family size was 4.03.

In the CDP, the population was spread out, with 39.2% under the age of 18, 11.6% from 18 to 24, 26.7% from 25 to 44, 16.1% from 45 to 64, and 6.4% who were 65 years of age or older. The median age was 24 years. For every 100 females, there were 100.3 males. For every 100 females age 18 and over, there were 94.7 males.

The median income for a household in the CDP was $23,538, and the median income for a family was $24,136. Males had a median income of $16,335 versus $15,121 for females. The per capita income for the CDP was $6,323. About 32.8% of families and 34.0% of the population were below the poverty line, including 46.2% of those under age 18 and 24.4% of those age 65 or over.

Education
The Gadsden Independent School District operates public schools, including Vado Elementary School, the designated high school for this area would be Gadsden High School. or  Alta Vista Early College High School.

References

Further reading

Census-designated places in Doña Ana County, New Mexico
Census-designated places in New Mexico
Populated places established by African Americans
1920 establishments in New Mexico
Populated places established in 1920
New Mexico populated places on the Rio Grande